"Bird Song", is a 1979 song written by Lene Lovich and Les Chappell, released as a single by Lene Lovich, from the album Flex. It charted at 39 in the UK.

References

Lene Lovich songs
1979 singles
1979 songs